Gerd Klier (16 January 1944 – 21 March 2011) was a professional German footballer.

Klier made a total of 24 appearances in the Fußball-Bundesliga for Hamburger SV during his playing career.

References

External links 
 
 Gerd Klier – 1. FSV Mainz 05 archives 

1944 births
2011 deaths
People from Rheingau-Taunus-Kreis
Sportspeople from Darmstadt (region)
German footballers
Association football forwards
Bundesliga players
2. Bundesliga players
Fortuna Düsseldorf players
Hamburger SV players
1. FSV Mainz 05 players
Footballers from Hesse
Freiburger FC players
West German footballers